Pierre Bazzo (born 17 January 1954) is a French former racing cyclist. He rode in nine editions of the Tour de France between 1977 and 1985. Bazzo tested positive for the anabolic steroid nandrolone after the 7th stage of the 1983 Tour de France.

Major results

1976
 1st Stage 8 Tour de l'Avenir
1977
 6th Overall Circuit Cycliste Sarthe
1978
 1st Stage 3 Tour du Vaucluse
 2nd Grand Prix de Plumelec-Morbihan
1979
 1st Grand Prix de Mauléon-Moulins
 2nd Overall Tour du Limousin
 6th Overall Critérium International
 6th Overall Étoile de Bessèges
 9th GP Ouest France-Plouay
1980
 1st Stage 4 Paris–Nice
 5th Liège–Bastogne–Liège
 5th GP Ouest France-Plouay
 5th Overall Critérium International
 9th Overall Tour de France
1981
 4th Overall Paris–Nice
 7th GP Ouest France-Plouay
1982
 1st Grand Prix de Mauléon-Moulins
 6th Overall Tour du Limousin
 6th GP de la Ville de Rennes
1983
 1st Tour de Vendée
 1st GP Ouest France-Plouay
 2nd Overall Tour du Limousin
1984
 1st Grand Prix de Plumelec-Morbihan
 2nd GP de Fourmies
 2nd Grand Prix de Cannes
 6th Overall Four Days of Dunkirk
1985
 3rd Overall Critérium du Dauphiné Libéré
1st Stage 5

References

External links
 

1954 births
Living people
Doping cases in cycling
French sportspeople in doping cases
French male cyclists
Cyclists from Nouvelle-Aquitaine
Sportspeople from Gironde
20th-century French people